Fem-1 homolog A is a protein that in humans is encoded by the FEM1A gene.

References

Further reading